Phlebophyllum is a genus of fungi in the order Agaricales. It is incertae sedis with respect to familial placement within the order. The genus is monotypic, containing the single species Phlebophyllum vitellinum, discovered in Gabon and reported as new to science by mycologist Roger Heim in 1969.

References

Agaricales enigmatic taxa
Fungi of Africa
Monotypic Agaricales genera